Phaeophacidium is a genus of fungi in the Rhytismatales order. The relationship of this taxon to other taxa within the order is unknown (incertae sedis), and it has not yet been placed with certainty into any family.

Species
The genus includes the following three species:

 Phaeophacidium abietinum
 Phaeophacidium escalloniae
 Phaeophacidium viburni

Naeviella volkartiana was formerly included in this genus under the name Phaeophacidium volkartianum.

References

External links
 Index Fungorum

Leotiomycetes
Taxa named by Gustav Lindau